Reiki share, also known as Reiki circle or exchange, is a gathering of Reiki believers who participate in group Reiki treatments on each other. The main purpose for the Reiki share is to give and receive Reiki in a casual atmosphere of friendship, honor, positive energy and devotion.  Reiki shares usually last a few hours or they can be all-day events. The gatherings are often free or the host may ask for a small donation.

Reiki is a pseudoscience, and is used as an illustrative example of pseudoscience in scholarly texts and academic journal articles. It is based on qi ("chi"), which practitioners say is a universal life force, although there is no empirical evidence that such a life force exists.

Purpose
Practitioners claim Reiki share offers recipients the combined wisdom and skill from multiple practitioners with different levels of experience. Time spent on the table(s) is shorter than a private Reiki session, but recipients receive attention from several pairs of hands simultaneously. Practitioners also claim that they benefit from giving Reiki as well as receiving it.  In addition to giving and receiving Reiki, Reiki shares offer participants the opportunity to: 
 Socialize and make new friends in their Reiki community
 Learn about Reiki through peer support
 Find a Reiki client, practitioner, or trainer

Meeting agendas
Each Reiki event is different, but they usually include one of more of the following activities:
 self introductions
 talks
 presentations
 prayers (often silent)
 meditation 
 singing bowls 
 reflexology
 chakra healing
 chanting
 smudging
 aromatherapy
 gemstones 
Others include a variety of different rituals.

During a Reiki share, the recipients ultimately break into small groups and take turns lying down on massage tables. Multiple practitioners gather around each recipient and place their hands on or over them, rotating to make sure all attendees receive a similar amount of attention.

Exchanges
Reiki exchange implies that both people in the exchange are practitioners.  Exchanges are generally restricted to Reiki practitioners.

Circles
Circle implies that at some point, the group sits or stands in a circle, sometimes called healing circles.  Reiki circles are generally open to the public.

Mawashi Reiki
A circle ritual that practitioners claim helps "sensitize" and "ground" the practitioners at the beginning of a share.  Participants join hands, and conclude with a bow of gratitude with hands in the Gassho (prayer) position.

See also
 Therapeutic touch
 Energy medicine
 Energy (esotericism)
 Vitalism
 Laying on of hands
 Faith healing

References

External links
 Reiki Share - Meetups.com
  The International Center for Reiki Training

Reiki